Mark Sean Jones (born 5 June 1966) is a former Australian association football player. He last served as manager of the Newcastle Jets.

Playing career 
Jones began his career with Newcastle Rosebud in 1985 before joining Sydney Croatia in 1987, where he enjoyed the most success including winning the NSL Cup in 1987 and made the NSL Grand Final in 1988. He joined Marconi Fairfield in 1990 and spent two seasons at Bossley Park before finishing his career in his hometown with Newcastle Breakers in the 1993/1994 season. Playing as a midfielder and as a defender, Jones concluded his NSL career with over 200 NSL games to his name.

He represented the Australia U-20 team at the 1985 Fifa World Youth Championship in the USSR, where he played all three games.

Managerial career 
Jones possesses an FFA A Licence, an AFC Pro Licence, is a certified Asian Football Confederation elite conditioning instructor and is one of only 12 accredited FIFA fitness instructors. Jones' status as one of only twelve FIFA Fitness Instructors has allowed him to be an instructor at a number of FIFA Football Fitness courses in Bahrain, North Korea, Singapore, and the United Arab Emirates.

Jones began his managerial career at the N.S.W. Institute of Sport in 2000 where he was head coach of the women program before taking up an assistant coach role at Newcastle Jets in 2006.

Following the takeover by Nathan Tinkler in late 2010, Mark Jones left his post, as the assistant coach to Branko Culina, in a mutual-termination. Jones had made a recognizable contribution to the club, aiding Newcastle in their first Championship.

Jones worked as an assistant coach for 5 months with Chongqing Lifan, before departing in May 2012. He was subsequently appointed as an assistant coach with Perth Glory FC, where he was charged with overseeing technique, conditioning and video analysis.

After departing from his role with Perth Glory in December 2012, In 2013, Jones was appointed as manager of the Central Coast Mariners Academy.

In early 2015, following major staff and player changes by Newcastle Jets owner and chairman, Nathan Tinkler, Jones was appointed assistant to Phil Stubbins with the first team. Jones also took on the role of Strength and Conditioning Coach at the club.

In January 2016, Jones joined Adelaide United to coach their youth team. 8 months later he was appointed to coach Adelaide United's women's side.

However, in September 2016, Jones was named as coach of Newcastle Jets with Clayton Zane as his assistant.

On 16 April 2017, Jones was sacked as manager of Newcastle, after the team finished last in the A-League.

Jones was appointed Technical Director of Football West State League Division 1 team Murdoch University Melville FC in February 2018. 
Since his departure from the Jets, Jones has also served as a university lecturer at Edith Cowan University and as a strength and conditioning educator at FIFA and the Asian Football Confederation. In 2021 Mark helped MUMFC to promotion to Football West State League Division 1

Managerial statistics

Honours 
With Sydney Croatia:
   NSL Cup: 1987

References

External links 
Coach profile at newcastlejets.com.au
Player stats at fifa.com
Player profile at ozfootball.net

1966 births
Living people
Australian soccer players
National Soccer League (Australia) players
Marconi Stallions FC players
Sydney United 58 FC players
Sportspeople from Newcastle, New South Wales
Soccer players from New South Wales
Newcastle Jets FC managers
Association football defenders
Australian soccer coaches
Newcastle Breakers FC players